Patrick "Pat" Healy (born July 20, 1983) is an American professional retired mixed martial artist who last competed in the Lightweight division of ACB. A professional competitor since 2001, Healy has also formerly competed for the UFC, Strikeforce, the WEC, the IFL, the MFC, King of the Cage, Titan FC and Shark Fights. His twin brother, Ryan, is also a professional mixed martial artist. Healy holds notable wins over Dan Hardy, Paul Daley, and Carlos Condit.

Background
Born and raised in Salem, Oregon, Healy and his twin brother, Ryan, have been training to fight in mixed martial arts since they were 14 years old. A friend trained in Muay Thai and would spar with them, knocking out Ryan with a head kick the first time they trained, and this would result in a long line of more combat sports experience. Healy also wrestled while growing up, placing in the state finals for South Salem High School and finishing seventh while also being a four-year letterman in the sport. Healy was also a two-time All-State selection in football and later competed in collegiate wrestling for Southern Illinois University Edwardsville, which was then a Division II program.

Mixed martial arts career

World Extreme Cagefighting
With a record of 9–6, Healy signed on with small upstart promotion, World Extreme Cagefighting. Healy made his debut at WEC 15 against future Cage Rage World Welterweight Champion and UFC veteran, Chris Lytle, losing via a close split decision.

Healy did not fight for the promotion for an entire year but won four of his next five fights which included a win over future UFC and Strikeforce veteran Paul Daley via guillotine choke submission. Healy then returned to the WEC at WEC 19 against UFC veteran Tiki Ghosn. The fight was called off after Ghosn injured his shoulder and was declared unable to continue. Healy then won his next four fights which included a win over future UFC Interim Welterweight Champion Carlos Condit via rear-naked choke submission.

Ultimate Fighting Championship
In 2006, Healy was signed to fight The Ultimate Fighter veteran, Anthony Torres, at UFC Fight Night 6. Torres took Healy down and controlled him on the ground before securing a rear-naked choke submission ending the fight midway through round one.

International Fight League
Healy signed with the International Fight League, competing for the Nevada Lions and made his debut for the organization on January 19, 2007, in Oakland, California, winning via unanimous decision. In his next appearance Healy faced future UFC veteran and Miletich Fighting Systems product, Rory Markham and lost after he was knocked out in the third round. Healy's next bout was against future King of the Cage Welterweight Champion Mike Guymon and Healy won via split decision before dropping a unanimous decision loss to future UFC Welterweight Jake Ellenberger. This was Healy's last appearance for the organization, as it would close operations months later.

Maximum Fighting Championships
When Healy signed with the Canadian promotion, Maximum Fighting Championships, he was immediately named the number one contender for the MFC Welterweight Title.

His title shot came at MFC 17 against the then champion, Ryan Ford. Healy won the fight via submission in the third round. His first and only title defense was a rematch against Ford. Healy again won the fight by a narrow split decision before signing with Shark Fights and competing for the Welterweight Championship in that organization as well, but lost to current UFC veteran TJ Waldburger. Healy relinquished his title after signing with Strikeforce.

Strikeforce
Healy dropped down to lightweight and fought one fight in the weight class, a win, before he began fighting for Strikeforce. Healy made his Strikeforce debut in May 2010 at Strikeforce Challengers: Lindland vs. Casey, defeating former Heavyweight fighter Bryan Travers via unanimous decision.

Healy fought former Strikeforce Lightweight Champion Josh Thomson at Strikeforce: Fedor vs. Werdum. Healy lost the fight via rear-naked choke submission in the third round.

Healy headlined a fight against undefeated Lyle Beerbohm at Strikeforce Challengers: Beerbohm vs. Healy. He won the fight via unanimous decision, handing Beerbohm his first professional loss.

At Strikeforce Challengers: Gurgel vs. Duarte, Healy fought debuting Eric Wisely, winning the fight via unanimous decision.

At Strikeforce World Grand Prix: Barnett vs. Kharitonov, Healy replaced an injured Josh Thomson, defeating Maximo Blanco via second round submission due to a rear-naked choke submission.

Healy faced Caros Fodor at Strikeforce: Tate vs. Rousey and won via submission in the third round.

Healy faced Mizuto Hirota at Strikeforce: Rockhold vs. Kennedy. He won via unanimous decision.

Having won five fights in a row, Healy was offered a title fight against Strikeforce Lightweight Champion Gilbert Melendez at Strikeforce: Melendez vs. Healy on September 29, 2012.  However, on September 23, it was announced that the card would be cancelled when Melendez pulled out of the fight due to injury.

The title fight with Melendez was then rescheduled for the final Strikforce show, Strikeforce: Marquardt vs. Saffiedine, on January 12, 2013. Once again, Melendez pulled out of the bout citing a shoulder injury.
Healy stayed on the card as he was to face Jorge Masvidal. However, on December 22, it was announced that Masvidal pulled out of the fight due to a back injury. On January 2, it was announced that Healy would face an undefeated newcomer Kurt Holobaugh. He won the fight via unanimous decision.

Return to the UFC
Healy returned to the UFC to face Jim Miller on April 27, 2013, at UFC 159.  He won the back-and-forth fight via technical submission due to a rear naked choke in the third round.  The bout also won him Fight of the Night and Submission of the Night bonus awards. On May 14, 2013, Healy was suspended for 90 days for failing a drug test for marijuana. The fight result was changed to No Contest, and his submission bonus was rescinded, going instead to Bryan Caraway, who also fought on the card. Healy also lost his Fight of the Night bonus.

Healy faced Khabib Nurmagomedov on September 21, 2013, at UFC 165. He lost the fight via unanimous decision.

Healy was expected to face Jamie Varner on December 14, 2013, at UFC on Fox 9. However, Varner pulled out of the bout due to injury and was replaced by Bobby Green He lost the fight via unanimous decision.

Healy faced Jorge Masvidal at UFC on Fox 11. He lost the fight via unanimous decision.

Healy faced Gleison Tibau on July 16, 2014, at UFC Fight Night 45. He lost the fight via unanimous decision, and was subsequently released from the promotion.

Independent promotions
On December 20, 2014, Healy faced Bellator veteran Ricardo Tirloni at Arena Tour 4. He won the back and forth fight by split decision.

Return to Titan Fighting Championship
On December 23, 2014, it was announced that Healy had signed a multi-fight contract with Titan FC, and was expected to return to the promotion in early 2015. On March 20, 2015, he faced undefeated Kurt Kinser for the inaugural Titan FC Lightweight Championship at Titan FC 33. Healy won the fight via split decision.

Healy was originally scheduled to make his first title defense against fellow UFC veteran Mike Ricci at Titan FC 34 on July 18, 2015, however, Ricci was forced out of the bout due to injury and was replaced by Marcus Edwards. Healy won the fight via third-round TKO. For his next title defense, Healy is expected to headline Titan FC 35 against veteran Rick Hawn. He missed weight for this fight, and was stripped of the title; the vacant championship remained on the line for Hawn only. Hawn won the fight by split decision.

Absolute Championship Berkut
Healy faced Leandro Silva on January 13, 2017, at ACB 51: Silva vs. Torgeson. He lost the fight via TKO in the first round.

Healy faced Brendan Loughnane on on July 22, 2017, at ACB 65: Silva vs. Agnaev. He won the back-and-forth fight via split decision.

Healy faced Magomed Raisov on January 13, 2018, at ACB 78: Young Eagles 24. He lost the fight via technical knockout and announced his retirement from competing professionally at his Facebook after the loss.

Championships and accomplishments
Ultimate Fighting Championship
Fight of the Night (one time)
Maximum Fighting Championship
MFC Welterweight Championship (One time)
One successful title defense
Titan Fighting Championship
TFC Lightweight Championship (One time)
One successful title defense

Mixed martial arts record

|-
| Loss
| align=center| 34–24 (1)
| Magomed Raisov
| TKO (punches)
| ACB 78: Young Eagles 24
| 
| align=center| 1
| align=center| 1:37
| Grozny, Russia 
|
|-
| Win
| align=center| 34–23 (1)
| Brendan Loughnane
| Decision (split)
|ACB 65: Silva vs. Agnaev
| 
| align=center| 3
| align=center| 5:00
| Sheffield, England
|
|-
| Loss
| align=center| 33–23 (1)
| Leandro Silva
| TKO (punches)
| |ACB 51: Silva vs. Torgeson
| 
| align=center| 1
| align=center| 0:38
| Irvine, California, United States
|
|-
| Loss
| align=center| 33–22 (1)
| Gesias Cavalcante
| KO (punches)
| Titan FC 39: Cavalcante vs. Healy
| 
| align=center| 1
| align=center| 2:07
| Coral Gables, Florida, United States
| 
|-
| Win
| align=center| 33–21 (1)
| Muhsin Corbbrey
| Decision (unanimous)
| Titan FC 37
| 
| align=center| 3
| align=center| 5:00
| Ridgefield, Washington, United States
| 
|-
| Loss
| align=center| 32–21 (1)
| Rick Hawn
| Decision (split)
| Titan FC 35
| 
| align=center| 5
| align=center| 5:00
| Ridgefield, Washington, United States
| 
|-
| Win
| align=center| 32–20 (1)
| Marcus Edwards
| TKO (punches)
| Titan FC 34
| 
| align=center| 2
| align=center| 3:17
| Kansas City, Missouri, United States
| 
|-
| Win
| align=center| 31–20 (1)
| Kurt Kinser
| Decision (split)
| Titan FC 33
| 
| align=center| 5
| align=center| 5:00
| Mobile, Alabama, United States
| 
|-
| Win
| align=center| 30–20 (1)
| Ricardo Tirloni
| Decision (split)
| Arena Tour 4: Healy vs. Tirloni
| 
| align=center| 3
| align=center| 5:00
| Buenos Aires, Argentina
|
|-
| Loss
| align=center| 29–20 (1)
| Gleison Tibau
| Decision (unanimous)
| UFC Fight Night: Cowboy vs. Miller
| 
| align=center| 3
| align=center| 5:00
| Atlantic City, New Jersey, United States
| 
|-
| Loss
| align=center| 29–19 (1)
| Jorge Masvidal
| Decision (unanimous)
| UFC on Fox: Werdum vs. Browne
| 
| align=center| 3
| align=center| 5:00
| Orlando, Florida, United States
| 
|-
| Loss
| align=center| 29–18 (1)
| Bobby Green
| Decision (unanimous)
| UFC on Fox: Johnson vs. Benavidez 2
| 
| align=center| 3
| align=center| 5:00
| Sacramento, California, United States
| 
|-
| Loss
| align=center| 29–17 (1)
| Khabib Nurmagomedov
| Decision (unanimous)
| UFC 165
| 
| align=center| 3
| align=center| 5:00
| Toronto, Ontario, Canada
| 
|-
| NC
| align=center| 29–16 (1)
| Jim Miller
| NC (overturned)
| UFC 159
| 
| align=center| 3
| align=center| 4:02
| Newark, New Jersey, United States
| 
|-
| Win
| align=center| 29–16
| Kurt Holobaugh
| Decision (unanimous)
| Strikeforce: Marquardt vs. Saffiedine
| 
| align=center| 3
| align=center| 5:00
| Oklahoma City, Oklahoma, United States
| 
|-
| Win
| align=center| 28–16
| Mizuto Hirota
| Decision (unanimous)
| Strikeforce: Rockhold vs. Kennedy
| 
| align=center| 3
| align=center| 5:00
| Portland, Oregon, United States
| 
|-
| Win
| align=center| 27–16
| Caros Fodor
| Submission (arm-triangle choke)
| Strikeforce: Tate vs. Rousey
| 
| align=center| 3
| align=center| 3:35
| Columbus, Ohio, United States
| 
|-
| Win
| align=center| 26–16
| Maximo Blanco
| Submission (rear-naked choke)
| Strikeforce: Barnett vs. Kharitonov
| 
| align=center| 2
| align=center| 4:27
| Cincinnati, Ohio, United States
| 
|-
| Win
| align=center| 25–16
| Eric Wisely
| Decision (unanimous)
| Strikeforce Challengers: Gurgel vs. Duarte
| 
| align=center| 3
| align=center| 5:00
| Las Vegas, Nevada, United States
| 
|-
| Win
| align=center| 24–16
| Lyle Beerbohm
| Decision (unanimous)
| Strikeforce Challengers: Beerbohm vs. Healy
| 
| align=center| 3
| align=center| 5:00
| Cedar Park, Texas, United States
| 
|-
| Loss
| align=center| 23–16
| Josh Thomson
| Submission (rear-naked choke)
| Strikeforce: Fedor vs. Werdum
| 
| align=center| 3
| align=center| 4:27
| San Jose, California, United States
| 
|-
| Win
| align=center| 23–15
| Bryan Travers
| Decision (unanimous)
| Strikeforce Challengers: Lindland vs. Casey
| 
| align=center| 3
| align=center| 5:00
| Portland, Oregon, United States
| 
|-
| Win
| align=center| 22–15
| Sidney Silva
| TKO (knee to the body)
| W-1 MMA: Bad Blood
| 
| align=center| 2
| align=center| 2:33
| Montreal, Quebec, Canada
| 
|-
| Win
| align=center| 21–15
| Sal Woods
| Submission (D'arce choke)
| TTP: Warriors Collide
| 
| align=center| 1
| align=center| 4:31
| Glen Carbon, Illinois, United States
| 
|-
| Loss
| align=center| 20–15
| TJ Waldburger
| Decision (unanimous)
| Shark Fights 6: Stars & Stripes
| 
| align=center| 3
| align=center| 5:00
| Amarillo, Texas, United States
| 
|-
| Win
| align=center| 20–14
| Ryan Ford
| Decision (split)
| MFC 20
| 
| align=center| 5
| align=center| 5:00
| Enoch, Alberta, Canada
| 
|-
| Win
| align=center| 19–14
| Ryan Ford
| Submission (armbar)
| MFC 17: Hostile Takeover
| 
| align=center| 3
| align=center| 3:00
| Edmonton, Alberta, Canada
| 
|-
| Loss
| align=center| 18–14
| Jake Ellenberger
| Decision (unanimous)
| IFL: Las Vegas
| 
| align=center| 3
| align=center| 4:00
| Las Vegas, Nevada, United States
| 
|-
| Win
| align=center| 18–13
| Mike Guymon
| Decision (split)
| IFL: Las Vegas
| 
| align=center| 3
| align=center| 4:00
| Las Vegas, Nevada, United States
| 
|-
| Loss
| align=center| 17–13
| Rory Markham
| KO (punches)
| IFL: Moline
| 
| align=center| 3
| align=center| 1:47
| Moline, Illinois, United States
| 
|-
| Win
| align=center| 17–12
| Ray Steinbeiss
| Decision (unanimous)
| IFL: Oakland
| 
| align=center| 3
| align=center| 4:00
| Oakland, California, United States
| 
|-
| Win
| align=center| 16–12
| Tim Stout
| Submission
| Wild Bill's: Fight Night 5
| 
| align=center| 1
| align=center| 2:10
| Duluth, Georgia, United States
| 
|-
| Loss
| align=center| 15–12
| Anthony Torres
| Submission (rear-naked choke)
| UFC Fight Night 6
| 
| align=center| 1
| align=center| 2:37
| Las Vegas, Nevada, United States
| 
|-
| Win
| align=center| 15–11
| Carlos Condit
| Submission (rear-naked choke)
| Extreme Wars 3: Bay Area Brawl
| 
| align=center| 3
| align=center| 2:53
| Oakland, California, United States
| 
|-
| Win
| align=center| 14–11
| Steve Schneider
| Submission (rear-naked choke)
| Titan FC 3
| 
| align=center| 1
| align=center| 3:54
| Durant, Oklahoma, United States
| 
|-
| Win
| align=center| 13–11
| Brandon Melendez
| Submission (rear-naked choke)
| SF 15: Tribute
| 
| align=center| 2
| align=center| 2:56
| Portland, Oregon, United States
| 
|-
| Win
| align=center| 12–11
| Tiki Ghosn
| TKO (shoulder injury)
| WEC 19
| 
| align=center| 3
| align=center| 0:25
| Lemoore, California, United States
| 
|-
| Loss
| align=center| 11–11
| Chris Wilson
| KO (knee)
| SF 14: Resolution
| 
| align=center| 1
| align=center| 1:28
| Portland, Oregon, United States
| 
|-
| Loss
| align=center| 11–10
| Carlo Prater
| Submission (arm-triangle choke)
| Euphoria: USA vs. Japan
| 
| align=center| 2
| align=center| 3:57
| Atlantic City, New Jersey, United States
| 
|-
| Win
| align=center| 11–9
| Curt McKinnon
| Submission (guillotine choke)
| KOTC: Firestorm
| 
| align=center| 1
| align=center| 2:01
| Calgary, Alberta, Canada
| 
|-
| Win
| align=center| 10–9
| Eddy Ellis
| TKO (punches)
| SF 12: Breakout
| 
| align=center| 1
| align=center| 4:40
| Portland, Oregon, United States
| 
|-
| Loss
| align=center| 9–9
| Jay Hieron
| Decision (unanimous)
| IFC: Rock N' Rumble
| 
| align=center| 3
| align=center| 5:00
| Reno, Nevada, United States
| 
|-
| Win
| align=center| 9–8
| Paul Daley
| Submission (guillotine choke)
| SF 11: Rumble at the Rose Garden
| 
| align=center| 2
| align=center| 3:15
| Portland, Oregon, United States
| 
|-
| Win
| align=center| 8–8
| Shane Wessels
| Submission (armbar)
| IFC: Michigan
| 
| align=center| N/A
| align=center| N/A
| Sault Ste Marie, Michigan, United States
| 
|-
| Loss
| align=center| 7–8
| Chris Lytle
| Decision (split)
| WEC 15
| 
| align=center| 3
| align=center| 5:00
| Lemoore, California, United States
| 
|-
| Loss
| align=center| 7–7
| Dustin Denes
| Decision (unanimous)
| Absolute Fighting Championships 12
| 
| align=center| 3
| align=center| 5:00
| Fort Lauderdale, Florida, United States
| 
|-
| Win
| align=center| 7–6
| Mike Wunderlich
| Submission (rear-naked choke)
| IFC: Warriors Challenge 19
| 
| align=center| 1
| align=center| N/A
| Sault Ste Marie, Michigan, United States
| 
|-
| Loss
| align=center| 6–6
| Francisco Soares
| Submission (heel hook)
| Freestyle Combat Challenge 18
| 
| align=center| 1
| align=center| N/A
| Racine, Wisconsin, United States
| 
|-
| Win
| align=center| 6–5
| Dan Hardy
| Submission (guillotine choke)
| Absolute Fighting Championships 10
| 
| align=center| 1
| align=center| 3:50
| Fort Lauderdale, Florida, United States
| 
|-
| Loss
| align=center| 5–5
| Dave Strasser
| Decision (unanimous)
| Madtown Throwdown 1
| 
| align=center| 3
| align=center| 5:00
| Madison, Wisconsin, United States
| 
|-
| Win
| align=center| 5–4
| Dan Hart
| Submission (rear-naked choke)
| Freestyle Combat Challenge 15
| 
| align=center| 1
| align=center| 2:44
| Racine, Wisconsin, United States
| 
|-
| Loss
| align=center| 4–4
| Derrick Noble
| Submission (guillotine choke)
| HOOKnSHOOT: Boot Camp 1.1
| 
| align=center| 2
| align=center| N/A
| Evansville, Indiana, United States
| 
|-
| Win
| align=center| 4–3
| Richard Johnston
| TKO (punches)
| Ultimate Ring Challenge 3
| 
| align=center| 2
| align=center| 2:20
| Kelso, Washington, United States
| 
|-
| Loss
| align=center| 3–3
| Brad Blackburn
| KO (punches)
| Rumble in the Ring 8
| 
| align=center| 1
| align=center| 0:39
| Auburn, Washington, United States
| 
|-
| Loss
| align=center| 3–2
| Denis Kang
| Submission (guillotine choke)
| Rumble in the Ring 7
| 
| align=center| 1
| align=center| 3:42
| Auburn, Washington, United States
| 
|-
| Win
| align=center| 3–1
| Rich Guerin
| TKO (punches)
| FCFF: Throwdown on the Fairground 1
| 
| align=center| N/A
| align=center| N/A
| Prineville, Oregon, United States
| 
|-
| Win
| align=center| 2–1
| Sherk Julian
| TKO (punches)
| FCFF: Throwdown on the Fairground 1
| 
| align=center| N/A
| align=center| N/A
| Prineville, Oregon, United States
| 
|-
| Win
| align=center| 1–1
| Eddie Evans
| Submission (rear-naked choke)
| FCFF: Rumble at the Roseland 3
| 
| align=center| N/A
| align=center| N/A
| Portland, Oregon, United States
| 
|-
| Loss
| align=center| 0–1
| Brad Blackburn
| TKO (punches)
| PPKA: Muckleshoot
| 
| align=center| 1
| align=center| 0:39
| Auburn, Washington, United States
|

References

External links
 
 

1983 births
Living people
American male mixed martial artists
American sportspeople in doping cases
Doping cases in mixed martial arts
Mixed martial artists from Missouri
Lightweight mixed martial artists
Welterweight mixed martial artists
Mixed martial artists utilizing collegiate wrestling
Mixed martial artists utilizing Brazilian jiu-jitsu
SIU Edwardsville Cougars wrestlers
Ultimate Fighting Championship male fighters
American male sport wrestlers
American practitioners of Brazilian jiu-jitsu